Babatounde Issiaka Bello (born 6 October 1989) is a former Beninese footballer who played as a midfielder.

Club career
Bello began playing football for FC Robo Academy in Nigeria. When he was 15, he came to Benin and joined Soleil in 2005. In July 2006, he signed for Slovak club MŠK Žilina and made his Corgoň Liga debut in a 3–0 home win against Slovan Bratislava on 9 September 2006. He spent two seasons mostly playing for the reserve squad. He joined Czech side Dukla Prague on loan in the autumn of 2008, although he didn't feature for the team before returning to Žilina six months later. Following his return, he scored two goals against Dubnica on 26 May 2009. He qualified with Žilina to the 2010–11 UEFA Champions League and played four group games, scoring a goal against Chelsea in a 2–1 loss at Stamford Bridge. He joined Jihlava of the Czech First League in August 2014.

International career
Born in Nigeria and of Beninese descent, Bello holds citizenship with both countries. On 17 August 2005, Bello made his debut for the Benin national football team, coming on as a substitute for 17 minutes against Sudan.

International goals

Scores and results list Benin's goal tally first.

Honours

Žilina
Slovak Super Liga: 2006–07, 2009–10
Slovak Super Cup: 2007, 2010

References

External links
MŠK Žilina profile
Corgoň Liga profile

1989 births
Living people
Sportspeople from Edo State
Association football midfielders
Citizens of Benin through descent
Beninese footballers
Benin international footballers
Nigerian footballers
Nigerian people of Beninese descent
MŠK Žilina players
FK Dukla Prague players
FC Vysočina Jihlava players
Slovak Super Liga players
Beninese expatriate sportspeople in Slovakia
Expatriate footballers in Slovakia
Beninese expatriate sportspeople in the Czech Republic
Expatriate footballers in the Czech Republic
Soleil FC players